Evert Schneider (born 4 February 1942) is a Dutch former tennis player.

Schneider is a native of The Hague and was a two-time national champion in doubles. In 1962 he represented the Netherlands in a Davis Cup tie against the Soviet Union in Scheveningen, featuring in both singles and doubles. He had a win over Ingo Buding to reach the second round of the 1964 U.S. National Championships.

See also
List of Netherlands Davis Cup team representatives

References

External links
 
 
 

1942 births
Living people
Dutch male tennis players
Sportspeople from The Hague